The North American Numbering Plan (NANP) is a telephone numbering plan for twenty-five regions in twenty countries, primarily in North America and the Caribbean. This group is historically known as World Zone 1 and has the international calling code 1. Some North American countries, most notably Mexico, do not participate in the NANP.

The concepts underlying the NANP were originally devised in the 1940s by the American Telephone and Telegraph Company (AT&T) for the Bell System and the independent telephone operators in North America. The goal was to unify the diverse local numbering plans that had been established in the preceding decades, speed call completion times, and reduce costs for toll calls, by reducing or eliminating manual labor by telephone operators, and eventually prepare the continent for direct-dialing of long-distance calls by customers. Direct dialing became possible in 1951 in a first trial, and was expanded across the nation in the decade following. AT&T continued to administer the numbering plan and the technical infrastructure until the breakup of the Bell System, when administration was delegated to the North American Numbering Plan Administrator (NANPA), a service that has been procured from the private sector by the Federal Communications Commission (FCC) in the United States. Each participating country forms a regulatory authority that has plenary control over local numbering resources. The FCC also serves as the U.S. regulator. Canadian numbering decisions are made by the Canadian Numbering Administration Consortium.

The NANP divides the territories of its members into numbering plan areas (NPAs) which are encoded numerically with a three-digit telephone number prefix, commonly called the area code. Each telephone is assigned a seven-digit telephone number unique only within its respective numbering plan area. The telephone number consists of a three-digit central office (or exchange) code and a four-digit station number. The combination of an area code and the telephone number serves as a destination routing address in the public switched telephone network (PSTN). The North American Numbering Plan conforms with International Telecommunication Union (ITU) Recommendation E.164, which establishes an international numbering framework.

History 

From the Bell System's beginnings in 1876 and throughout the first part of the 20th century, telephone networks grew from essentially local or regional telephone systems. These systems expanded by growing their subscriber bases, as well as increasing their service areas by implementing additional local exchanges that were interconnected with tie trunks. It was the responsibility of each local administration to devise telephone numbering plans that accommodated the local requirements and growth. As a result, the North American telephone service industry developed into an unorganized set of many differing local numbering systems. The diversity impeded the efficient operation and interconnection of exchanges into a nationwide system for long-distance telephone communication. By the 1940s, the Bell System set out to unify the various existing numbering plans to provide a unified, systematic approach for routing telephone calls across the nation and to provide efficient long-distance service that eventually did not require the involvement of switchboard operators.

In October 1947, AT&T published a new nationwide numbering plan in coordination with the independent telephone operators. The plan divided most of North America into eighty-six numbering plan areas (NPAs). Each NPA was assigned a unique three-digit code, typically called NPA code or simply area code. These codes were first used in Operator Toll Dialing by long-distance operators in establishing calls via trunks between toll offices. The goal of automatic service required additional technical advancements in the latest generation of toll-switching systems, completed by the early 1950s, and installation of new toll-switching systems in most numbering plan areas. The first customer-dialed direct call using an area code was made on November 10, 1951, from Englewood, New Jersey, to Alameda, California. Direct distance dialing (DDD) was subsequently introduced across the country. By the early 1960s, DDD had become commonplace in cities and most towns in the United States and Canada. By 1967, the number of assigned area codes had grown to 129.

The status of the network of the 1960s was reflected in a new name used in technical documentation: North American Integrated Network. By 1975, the numbering plan was referred to as the North American Numbering Plan, leading to the well-known acronym NANP, as other countries sought or considered joining in the standardization.

Foreign expansion 
Although Bermuda and the Caribbean islands had been assigned the area code 809 as early as 1958 by the administrators at AT&T, individual participating countries or territories had no autonomy over their numbering plan as they received centrally assigned central office prefixes that needed to be unique from those of other countries with the same area code. Regions in Mexico with high call volumes to and from the US were assigned functional area codes as early as 1963, for the purpose of call routing, but a nationwide system of participation in the NANP eventually failed.

In the following decades, the NANP expanded to include all of the United States and its territories, Canada, Bermuda, and seventeen nations of the Caribbean.

At the request of the British Colonial Office, the numbering plan was first expanded to Bermuda and the British West Indies because of their historic telecommunications administration through Canada as parts of the British Empire and their continued associations with Canada, especially during the years of the telegraph and the All Red Line system.

Not all North American polities participate in the NANP. Exceptions include Mexico, Greenland, Saint Pierre and Miquelon, the Central American countries and some Caribbean countries (Cuba, Haiti, the French Caribbean and the Dutch Caribbean, except for Sint Maarten). The only Spanish-speaking state in the system is the Dominican Republic. Mexican participation was planned, but implementation stopped after three area codes (706, 903 and 905) had been assigned, and Mexico opted for an international numbering format, using country code 52. The area codes in use were subsequently withdrawn in 1991.

The Dutch Caribbean territory of Sint Maarten joined the NANP in September 2011, receiving area code 721. Sint Maarten shares the island with the French Collectivity of Saint Martin which, like the rest of the French Caribbean, is not part of the NANP.

Administration 
The NANP is administered by the North American Numbering Plan Administrator (NANPA, formerly Administration). This function is overseen by the Federal Communications Commission, which assumed the responsibility upon the breakup of the Bell System. The FCC solicits private sector contracts for the role of the administrator.

Before the breakup of the Bell System, administration of the North American Numbering Plan was performed by AT&T's Central Services Organization. In 1984, this function was transferred to Bell Communications Research (Bellcore), a company created by the divestiture mandate to perform services for the newly created local exchange carriers. On January 19, 1998, the NANPA function was transferred to the IMS division of Lockheed Martin in Washington, D.C. In 1999, the contract was awarded to Neustar, a company spun off from Lockheed for this purpose. The contract was renewed in 2004, and again in 2012. On January 1, 2019, Somos assumed the NANPA function under a one-year bridge contract granted by the FCC with the goal of consolidating the NANPA function with the Pooling Administrator and identifying a long-term contract holder. On December 1, 2020, Somos secured the $76 million contract for a term of eight years against one other bidder.

Numbering plan 
The vision and goal of the architects of the North American Numbering Plan was a system by which telephone subscribers in the United States and Canada could themselves dial and establish a telephone call to any other subscriber without the assistance of switchboard operators. While this required an expansion of most existing local numbering plans, many of which required only four or five digits to be dialed, or even fewer in small communities, the plan was designed to enable local telephone companies to make as few changes as possible in their systems.

Numbering plan areas and central offices 
The new numbering plan divided the North American continent into regional service areas, called numbering plan areas (NPAs). The divisions primarily followed the jurisdictional boundaries of the U.S. states and the Canadian provinces. Some states or provinces needed to be divided into multiple areas. NPAs were created in accordance with principles deemed to maximize customer understanding and minimize dialing effort, while reducing plant cost. Each NPA was identified by a unique three-digit code number that was prefixed to the local telephone number, when calling from one NPA to another. Within the same numbering plan area, dialing the area code was not necessary.

The telephone exchanges—in the Bell System they were officially called central offices—became local exchange points in the nationwide system. Each of them was also assigned a three-digit number unique within its NPA. The combination of NPA code and central office code served as a destination routing code for use by operators to reach any central office through the switching network. Due to the numerical structure of the numbering system, each NPA was technically limited to 540 central offices.

Although the limitation to 540 central offices required the most populous states to be divided into multiple NPAs, it was not the sole reason to subdivide a state. An important aspect was the existing infrastructure for call routing, which had developed in preceding decades independently of state boundaries. The rules of determining areas also attempted to avoid cutting across busy toll traffic routes, so that most toll traffic remained within an NPA, and outgoing traffic in one area would not be tributary to toll offices in an adjacent area. As a result, New York state was initially divided into five areas, the most of any state. Illinois, Ohio, Pennsylvania, and Texas were assigned four NPAs each, and California, Iowa, and Michigan received three. Eight states and provinces were split into two NPAs.

Traditionally, central office switching systems were designed to serve up to ten thousand subscriber numbers. Thus, subscribers were assigned four-digit line or station numbers. This rounded out the total number of digits in a subscriber telephone number to ten: a three-digit area code, three-digit central office code, and four digits for each line. This fixed format defined the North American Numbering Plan as a closed numbering plan, as opposed to developments in  other countries where the number of digits was not fixed.

The closed numbering plan did not require the subscriber to dial all digits. When making a local call or a call within the same numbering plan area, the area code was omitted, resulting in seven-digit dialing. Ten-digit dialing was only necessary when placing foreign area calls to subscribers in another state or numbering plan area. Exceptions existed for communities located on NPA boundaries, so that uniform local dialing was still possible in historically established communities.

Initial numbering system 
In 1947, AT&T completed the new design for a nationwide toll network that established the original North American area codes. The new organization provided for 152 area codes, each with a capacity to serve up to 540 central offices. Originally, only eighty-six area codes were assigned. New Jersey received the first NPA code in the new system, area code 201. The second area code, 202, was assigned to the District of Columbia. The allocation of area codes was readjusted as early as 1948 to account for inadequacies in some metropolitan areas. For example, the Indiana numbering plan area 317 was divided to provide a larger numbering pool in the Indiana suburbs of Chicago (area code 219).

Initially, states divided into multiple numbering plan areas were assigned area codes with the digit 1 in the second position, while areas that comprised entire states or provinces received codes with 0 as the middle digit. This rule was broken by the early 1950s, as NPAs with digit 0 in the middle had to be split, but until 1995 all area codes assigned had none other than the digits 0 and 1 in this position.

The eight codes of the form N11 (N=2–9) were reserved as service codes. The easily recognizable codes of the form N00 were available in the numbering plan, but were not initially included in assignments. Additional area code patterns were later assigned for other services; for example, the area codes N10 were implemented for the Teletypewriter Exchange Service (TWX).

Central office codes 
It was already common practice for decades that the digits 0 and 1 could not appear in the first two digits of the central office codes, because the system of using the first two letters of familiar names for central offices did not assign letters to these digits. The digit 0 was used for operator assistance, and 1, which is essentially a single pulse of loop interruption, was automatically ignored by most switching equipment of the time. Therefore, the 0/1 rule for the area code provided a convenient means to distinguish seven-digit dialing from ten-digit dialing.

The use of telephone exchange names as part of telephone numbers had been a well-established practice, and this was preserved for convenience and expediency in the new network design. The letter-to-digit translations were printed on the face of every rotary dial in the metropolitan areas, according to a scheme designed by W.G. Blauvelt in 1917, that had been used in the Bell System in large metropolitan areas since the early 1920s. The network reorganization standardized this system to using a two-letter, five-digit (2L-5N) representation of telephone numbers in most exchanges in North America, or to using an equivalent all-numeric seven-digit numbering plans, as was practiced by some telephone companies.

All-number calling 

All-number calling was a telephone numbering plan introduced in 1958, that converted telephone numbers with exchange names to a numeric representation of seven digits.

The original plan of 1947 had been projected to be usable beyond the year 2000. However, by the late 1950s it became apparent that it would be outgrown by about 1975. The limitations for the usable leading digits of central office codes, imposed by using common names for central office names, and their leading two characters as guides for customer dialing could no longer be maintained when opening new central offices. By 1962 it was forecast that in 1985 the number of telephones in the nation would equal its population of 280 million and increase to 600 million telephones for 340 million people in 2000. As a result, the North American telephone administrations first introduced letter combinations that could not be linked to a familiar pronounceable central office name. Finally, they sought the elimination of central office names and letter codes, and introduced all-number calling (ANC).

Under all-number calling, the number of permissible central office prefixes increased from 540 to potentially 800, but the first two digits of the central office code were still restricted to the range 2 to 9, and the eight combinations that ended in 11 were reserved as special calling codes. This increased the numbering pool for central office codes to 640, and resulted in the partitioning of the prefix space (000—999).

Interchangeable central office codes 
As the numbering plan grew in the 1960s under all-number calling, plan administrators at AT&T identified that by c. 1973 some of the largest area codes in urban centers might run out of central office prefixes to install more individual access lines. For relief in these cases, they finally removed the requirement that the middle digit of the central office code could not be 0 or 1. This resulted in the format of interchangeable central office codes, N X X, where N=2–9 and X=0–9. The first cities that required this action, in 1974, were the cities of Los Angeles with area code 213 and New York with 212. This change also required modification of the local dialing procedures to distinguish local calls from long-distance calls with area codes.

Requiring 1 to be dialed before the full number in some areas provided for area codes of the form N10, such as 210 in the San Antonio, Texas, area and 410 in eastern Maryland. Therefore, someone calling from San Jose, California, to Los Angeles before the change would have dialed 213-555-0123 and after the change 1-213-555-0123, which permitted the use of 213 as an exchange prefix in the San Jose area. The preceding 1 also ideally indicates a toll call; however, this is inconsistent across the NANP because the FCC has left it to the U.S. state public utilities commissions to regulate for traditional landlines, and it has since become moot for mobile phones and digital VoIP services that now offer nationwide calling without the extra digit.

Interchangeable NPA codes 
In 1995, the North American Numbering Plan Administrator removed the requirement that the middle digit of an area code had to be either 0 or 1, implementing fully interchangeable NPA and central office codes, that had already been anticipated since the 1960s, when interchangeable central office codes were sanctioned.

Modern plan 
The NANP numbering format may be summarized in the ten-digit notation NXX NXX-XXXX, where the Ns denote any of the digits 2–9, and the Xs denote any digit 0–9.

Using 0 or 1 as the first digit of an area code or central office code is invalid, as is a 9 as the middle digit of an area code; these are trunk prefixes or reserved for North American Numbering Plan expansion.

For example, (234) 235-5678 is a valid telephone number; with area code 234, central office prefix (exchange) 235, and line number 5678. The number (234) 911-5678 is invalid, because the central office code must not be in the form N11. (314) 159-2653 is invalid, because the office code must not begin with 1. (123) 234-5678 is invalid, because the NPA must not begin with 0 or 1.

Each three-digit area code has a capacity of 7,919,900 telephone numbers (7,918,900 in the United States).

Despite the widespread use of fictional telephone numbers of the form NXX 555-XXXX, only the block of line numbers from 0100 through 0199 are specifically reserved for this purpose, leaving the rest available for assignment.

The country calling code for all countries participating in the NANP is 1. The prefix 1 is also used with the NANP for long-distance dialing.

Non-geographic services 
The North American Numbering Plan recognizes the need for non-geographic services by designating certain numbering blocks for such purposes. Many of these telephone numbers are selected from the easily recognizable codes (ERCs).

For system-wide toll-free calling, in which the receiving party is billed for the call, uses the number range with area codes of the form 8XX.

Area code and central office prefixes for other non-geographic services have the form 5XX-NXX. As of January 2021, the codes 500, 521, 522, 533, 544, 566, 577, 588, 523, 524, 525, and 526 have been designated. These codes are used for fixed or mobile devices, and not assigned to rate centers. As addresses, they may or may not traverse the public switched telephone network (PSTN). Applications include the use as personal 500 numbers.

Some carrier-specific services have used area code 700. In Canada, area code 600 is used for non-geographic applications. Area code 900 has been used for high-toll 900 numbers.

Cellular mobile services 
The North American Numbering Plan does not set aside special non-geographic area codes exclusively for cellular phones, as is customary in some other national telephone administrations. Only one regional exception exists in area code 600 in Canada.

For cellular services, telephone numbers in the NANP are allocated within each area code from special central office prefixes. Calls to them are billed at the same rate as any other call. Consequently, the caller pays pricing model adopted in other countries, in which calls to cellular phones are charged at a higher nationwide rate, but incoming mobile calls are not charged to the mobile user, could not be implemented. Instead, North American cellular telephone subscribers are also generally charged for receiving calls (subscriber pays). In the past, this has discouraged mobile users from publishing mobile telephone numbers, but by the first decade of the 21st century, most users selected bundle pricing plans that included an allotment of minutes expected to be used in the billing period, and most U.S. carriers now offer unlimited calling plans at mass-market prices.

Industry observers have attributed the relatively low mobile phone penetration rate in the United States, compared to that of Europe, to the subscriber-pays model. In this model the convenience of the mobility is charged to the subscriber. Callers from outside the local-calling region of the assigned number, however, pay for a long-distance call, although domestic long-distance rates are generally lower than the rates in caller-pays systems. Conversely, an advantage of caller-pays is the relative absence of telemarketing and nuisance calls to mobile numbers. The integrated numbering plan also enables local number portability between fixed and wireless services within a region, allowing users to switch to mobile service while keeping their telephone number.

The initial plan for area code overlays did allow for providing separate area codes for use by mobile devices, although these were still assigned to a specific geographical area, and were charged at the same rate as other area codes. Initially, the area code 917 for New York City was specifically assigned for this purpose within the boroughs; however, a Federal court overturned the practice and the use of an area code for a specific telephony purpose. Since mobile telephony has been expanding faster than landline use, new area codes typically have a disproportionately large fraction of mobile and nomadic numbers, although landline and other services rapidly follow and local network portability can blur these distinctions.

Growth 

Canada and the United States have experienced rapid growth in the number of area codes, particularly between 1990 and 2005. The widespread adoption of fax, modem, and mobile phone communication, as well as the deregulation of local telecommunication services in the United States in the mid-1990s, increased the demand for telephone numbers.

The Federal Communications Commission allowed telecommunication companies to compete with the incumbent local exchange carriers for services, usually by forcing the existing sole service provider to lease infrastructure to other local providers. Because of the original design of the numbering plan and the telephone switching network that assumed only a single provider, number allocations had to be made in 10,000-number blocks even when far fewer numbers were required for each new vendor. Due to the proliferation of service providers in some numbering plan areas, many area codes fell into jeopardy, facing exhaustion of numbering resources. The number blocks of failed service providers often remained unused, as no regulatory mechanism existed to reclaim and reassign these numbers.

Area codes are added by two principal methods, number plan area splits and overlays. Splits were implemented by dividing an area into two or more regions, one of which retained the existing area code and the other areas receiving a new code. In an overlay, multiple codes are assigned to the same geographical area, obviating the need for renumbering of existing services. Subtle variations of these techniques have been used as well, such as dedicated overlays, in which the new code is reserved for a particular type of service, such as cellular phones and pagers, and concentrated overlays, in which a part of the area retained a single code while the rest of the region received an overlay code. The only service-specific overlay in the NANP was area code 917 (New York City) when it was first installed; such service-specific area code assignments were later prohibited by the Federal Communications Commission.

Most area codes of the form N10, originally reserved for AT&T's Teletypewriter eXchange (TWX) service, were transferred to Western Union in 1969 and were freed up for other use in 1981 after conversion to Telex II service was complete. The last of these, 610, was assigned to Canada, but reassigned in 1992. These new area codes, as well as a few other codes used for routing calls to Mexico, were used for telephone area code splits in the late 1980s and early 1990s, as all other area codes under the original plan had been consumed.

After the remaining valid area codes were used up by expansion, in 1995 the rapid increase in the need for more area codes forced the NANPA to allow the digits 2 through 8 to be used as a middle digit in new area code assignments, with 9 being reserved as a last resort for potential future expansion. At the same time, local exchanges were allowed to use 1 or 0 as a middle digit. The first area codes without a 1 or 0 as the middle digit were area code 334 in Alabama and area code 360 in Washington, which both began service on January 15, 1995. This was quickly followed by area code 520 serving Arizona on March 19, 1995.

By 1995, many cities in the United States and Canada had more than one area code, either from dividing a city into different areas (NPA split) or having more than one code for the same area (NPA overlay). The overlay method requires that the area code must be dialed in all cases, even for local calls, while the split plan may permit seven-digit dialing within the same area. The transition to ten-digit dialing typically starts with a permissive dialing phase, which is widely publicized, during which dialing all ten digits is optional. After a period of several months, mandatory dialing begins, when seven-digit dialing is no longer permissible. Atlanta was the first U.S. city to require mandatory ten-digit dialing throughout the metropolitan area, roughly coinciding with the 1996 Summer Olympics held there. Atlanta was used as the test case not only because of its size, but also because it had the world's largest fiber-optic network at the time, five times larger than that of New York, and it was home to BellSouth (now part of AT&T), then the Southeastern Regional Bell Operating Company, with AT&T's fiber optics manufacturing facility within the city.

Growth problems 
Depending on the techniques used for area code and central office code relief, the effect on telephone users varies. In areas in which overlays were used, this generally avoids the need for converting telephone numbers, so existing directories, business records, letterheads, business cards, advertising, and "speed-dialing" settings can retain the same phone numbers, while the overlay is used for new number allocations. The primary effect on telephone users is the necessity of remembering and dialing 10- or 11-digit numbers when only 7-digit dialing was previously permissible.

Splitting instead of overlaying generally avoids the requirement for mandatory area-code dialing within the new regions, but at the expense of having to convert a region to the new code, which necessitates updating records and directories to accommodate the new numbers. A smooth adjustment to splitting requires a period of "permissive dialing" during which the new and old codes are both allowed to work. Also, many splittings involved significant technical issues, especially when the area splittings occurred over boundaries other than phone network divisions.

As an example, in 1998, the area code 612, assigned to the Minneapolis – Saint Paul Twin Cities, was split to create a new area code 651 for St. Paul and the eastern metropolitan area. The Minnesota Public Utilities Commission mandated that the new boundary exactly follow municipal boundaries, which were distinctly different from telephone exchange boundaries, and that all subscribers keep their seven-digit numbers. These two goals were directly at odds with the reason for the split, namely to provide additional telephone numbers. More than forty exchanges had territory that straddled the new boundary. As a result, prefixes were duplicated in both area codes, which counteracted much of the benefit of the split, with only 200 of 700 prefixes in area 612 moving entirely to area 651. In less than two years, area code 612 again exhausted its supply of telephone numbers, and necessitated a three-way split in 2000, creating the new area codes 763 and 952. The split again followed political boundaries, rather than rate center boundaries, resulting in additional split prefixes; a few numbers moved from 612 to 651 to 763 in less than two years.

Decrease of growth rate 
Recognizing that the proliferation of area codes was largely due to the telecom deregulation act and the assignment of numbers in blocks of ten thousand, the FCC instructed NANPA, by then administered by Neustar, to alleviate the numbering shortage. As a result, number pooling was piloted in 2001 as a system for allocating local numbers to carriers in blocks of 1,000 rather than 10,000. Because of the then design of the switched telephone network, this was a considerable technical obstacle. Number pooling was implemented with another technical obstacle, local number portability.

The program has been implemented in much of the United States by state regulators. Some cities have also implemented rate center consolidation; fewer rate centers resulted in more efficient use of telephone numbers, as carriers would reserve blocks of 1,000 or 10,000 numbers in each of multiple rate centers in the same area even if they had relatively few clients in the area. (A rate center is a geographical area used by a Local Exchange Carrier (LEC) to determine the boundaries for local calling, billing and assigning phone numbers. Typically a call within a rate center is local, while a call from one rate center to another is a long-distance call.) Together with aggressive reclamation of unused number blocks from telecom providers, number pooling has reduced the need for additional area codes, so that many previously designated area splits and overlays have been postponed indefinitely.

Canada never implemented number pooling, so that even the smallest villages are rate centers and every CLEC is assigned blocks of ten thousand numbers.

New area codes outside the contiguous United States and Canada 
Before 1995, all NANP countries and territories outside the contiguous United States, Alaska, Hawaii and Canada shared the area code 809. This included Puerto Rico and the U.S. Virgin Islands. Each has since been assigned one or more distinct numbering plan areas; area code 809 now exclusively serves the Dominican Republic (along with area codes 829 and 849). The United States Pacific territories of the Northern Mariana Islands and Guam joined the NANP in 1997, and American Samoa became an NANP member in October 2004. The Dutch possession of Sint Maarten was originally scheduled to join the NANP on May 31, 2010, but the changeover was postponed to September 30, 2011.

Telephone number size expansion 

The NANP exhaust analysis estimates that the existing numbering system is sufficient beyond 2049, based on the assumptions that a maximum of 674 NPAs continue to be available, and that on average 3,990 central office codes are needed per year.

In case of exhaustion, various plans are discussed for expanding the numbering plan. One option is to add the digit 1 or 0 either at the beginning or at the end of the area code, or prefixing it to the seven-digit subscriber number. This would require eleven-digit dialing even for local calls between any two NANP numbers. Another proposal introduces the digit 9 into the area code in the format x9xx, so that, for example, San Francisco's 415 would become 4915. Other proposals include reallocating blocks of numbers assigned to smaller long-distance carriers or unused reserved services.

Dialing procedures 
The structure of the North American Numbering Plan permits implementation of local dial plans in each plan area, depending on requirements. When multiple NPA codes serve an area in an overlay arrangement, ten-digit (10D) dialing is required. Seven-digit (7D) dialing may be permissible in areas with single area codes. Depending on the requirement of toll alerting, it may be necessary to prefix a telephone number with 1. The NANPA publishes dial plan information for individual area codes.

The standard dial plans in most cases are as follows:

The number of digits dialed is unrelated to being a local call or a toll call when there is no toll alerting. Allowing 7D local dial across an area code boundary, which is uncommon today, requires central office code protection, locally if using toll alerting, across the entire area code otherwise, to avoid assignment of the same seven-digit number on both sides. Landlines occasionally require 1+10D where 10D is required, most notably in California.

Most areas permit local calls as 1+10D except for Texas, Georgia, and some jurisdictions in Canada which require that landline callers know which numbers are local and which are toll, dialing 10D for local calls and 1+10D for all toll calls.

In almost all cases, domestic operator-assisted calls are dialed 0+10D.

Special numbers and codes 

Some common special numbers in the North American system:
 0 — operator assistance
 00 — long-distance operator assistance (formerly 2-1-1)
 011 — international access code using direct dial (for all destinations outside the NANP)
 01 — international access code using operator assistance (for all destinations outside the NANP)
 101-xxxx — used to select use of an alternative long-distance carrier
 211 — local community information or social services (in some cities)
 311 — city government or non-emergency police matters
 411 — local telephone directory service (Some telephone companies provide national directory assistance)
 511 — traffic, road, and tourist information
 611 — telephone line repair service (formerly 4104), wireless operator customer service (formerly 811)
 711 — relay service for customers with hearing or speech disabilities
 811 — local utility location services (United States), non-urgent telehealth/teletriage services in Canada (formerly telephone company business office)
 911 — emergency telephone number — fire department, medical emergency, police
 988 — National Suicide Prevention Lifeline (United States)
 950-xxxx — Feature group code for access to a carrier from a non-subscriber location. The feature requires the customer dial a 950-xxxx number and enter a calling card number and destination telephone number. It was originally used for locations where 101-xxxx dialing was not possible.
 958-xxxx (local); 959-xxxx (long distance) — Plant test numbers, such as automatic number announcement circuits. It was once common to reserve entire unused exchange prefixes or N11 numbers (4101 was ringback number on many step-by-step switches), but these have largely moved to individual unpublished numbers within the standard 958-xxxx (local) or 959-xxxx (long-distance) plant test exchanges as numbers become scarce.
 1 (NPA) 555-1212 — non-local directory information (Canada and United States)

Vertical service codes are used for special calling features, such as:

 *51 and 1151 — a history of unanswered calls on a telephone number, useful for those who are not Caller ID subscribers
 *57 and 1157 — used to trace harassing, threatening, abusive, obscene, etc. phone calls, and keep results of trace at phone company
 *66 and 1166 — to keep retrying a busy-line (see also Called-party camp-on)
 *67 and 1167 — Caller ID Block
 *69 and 1169 — Call Return (caller may press '1' to return call after hearing number)
 *70 and 1170 — cancel call waiting on a call-by-call basis
 *71 and 1171 — three-way calling, which lets a person talk to people in two different locations at the same time
 *74 and 1174 — speed dial, which allows someone to quickly dial any of eight frequently called numbers using a one-digit code, from any phone on their line
 *75 — allows a total of 30 speed-call numbers with two digits
 *77 — activates Anonymous Call Rejection Service
 *82 and 1182 — releases Caller ID block on a call-by-call basis
 *87 — deactivates Anonymous Call Rejection Service

The four-digit numbers are not implemented in some areas. The star codes (*) are for use on Touch-Tone telephones, whereas the four-digit numbers prefixed 11xx are used on rotary dial telephones which cannot dial the * symbol.

Not all NANP countries use the same codes. For example, the emergency telephone number is not always 911: Trinidad and Tobago and Dominica use 999, as in the United Kingdom. The country of Barbados uses 211 for police force, 311 for fire, and 511 for ambulance, while Jamaica uses 114 for directory assistance, 119 for police force, and 110 for fire and ambulance services.

Despite its early importance as a share of the worldwide telephone system, few of the NANP's codes, such as 911, have been adopted outside the system. Determining that 911 requires unnecessary rotation time on rotary dial telephones, the European Union has adopted its own standardized number of 112, while countries in Asia and the rest of the world use a variety of other two- or three-digit emergency telephone number combinations. The 112 code is gaining prevalence because of its preprogrammed presence in mobile telephones that conform to the European GSM standard. The European Union and many other countries have chosen the International Telecommunication Union's 00 as their international access number instead of 011. However, the toll-free prefix 800 has been widely adopted elsewhere, including as the international toll-free country code. It is often preceded by a 0 rather than a 1 in many countries where 0 is the trunk prefix.

International dialing 
While international direct dialing was available in some locations in the United States by the late 1950s, a continental system was introduced as
International Direct Distance Dialing (IDDD) for the territories of the North American Numbering Plan in March 1970.

While the NANP was designed as a closed numbering plan with ten digit telephone numbers, IDDD was implemented through extensive modifications in the switching systems to accommodate the international open numbering plan with seven to twelve digits in the national telephone numbers. Access to the international network is facilitated by the dialing prefix 011, after which the country calling code and the national telephone number are dialed.

Number portability 
The Telecommunications Act of 1996 ( (b)(2)) authorizes the Federal Communications Commission (FCC) to require all local exchange carriers (LECs) to offer local number portability. The FCC regulations were enacted on June 27, 1996, with changes to take effect in the one hundred largest Metropolitan Statistical Areas by October 1, 1997, and elsewhere by December 31, 1998.

The FCC directed the North American Numbering Council (NANC) to select one or more private-sector candidates for the local number portability administrator (LNPA) function, in a manner akin to the selection of the North American Numbering Plan Administrator (NANPA).

The toll-free telephone numbers in NPA 800, 888, 877, 866, 855, 844, and 833 have been portable through the RespOrg system since 1993.

Toll charges
Telephone calls between countries and territories of the NANP are not typically charged at domestic rates. For example, most long-distance plans may charge a California subscriber a higher rate for a call to British Columbia than for a call to New York, even though both destinations are within the NANP. Similarly, calls from Bermuda to U.S. destinations incur international rates. Even toll-free numbers may incur charges to callers. This is because many of the island nations implemented a plan of subsidizing the cost of local telephone services by directly charging higher pricing levies on international long-distance services.

Because of these higher fees, scams had taken advantage of customers' unfamiliarity with pricing structure to call the legacy regional area code 809. Some scams lured customers from the United States and Canada into placing expensive calls to the Caribbean, by representing area code 809 as a regular domestic, low-cost, or toll-free call. The split of 809 (which formerly served all of the Caribbean NANP points) into multiple new area codes created many new, unfamiliar prefixes which could be mistaken for U.S. or Canada domestic area codes but carried high tariffs. In various island nations, premium exchanges such as +1-876-HOT-, +1-876-WET- or +1-876-SEX- (where 876 is Jamaica) became a means to circumvent consumer-protection laws governing area code 900 or similar U.S.-domestic premium numbers.

The occurrence of these scams has been on the decline, with many of the Cable and Wireless service monopolies being opened up to competition, hence lowering rates. Additionally, many Caribbean territories have implemented local government agencies to regulate telecommunications rates of providers.

Countries and territories 
Of all states or territories, the U.S. state of California has the largest number of area codes assigned, followed by Texas, Florida and New York, while most countries of the Caribbean use only one. Many Caribbean codes were assigned based on alphabetic abbreviations of the territory name, as indicated in the third column of the following table (Letter code). This follows the traditional letter assignments on telephone dials. For some Pacific islands, the NANPA area code is the same as the country code that was discontinued upon membership in the NANP.

Membership in the NANP brings significant advantages for countries in the vicinity of the United States and Canada, which usually are already the top dialing destinations. Both countries also originate most of the tourism business for the Caribbean. This is enhanced by the integration from sharing the same dialing procedures, without international access codes, and the toll-free number system of the NANP, as businesses in all member countries are eligible to participate.

Alphabetic mnemonic system 

Many telephone dials and keypads maintain a tradition of alphabetic dialing. Usually each pushbutton from digit 2 to 9 also displays three letters, which is standardized in ISO 9995-8 and, in Europe, E.161. Historically, the letters Q and Z were omitted, although some modern telephones contain them. SMS-capable devices have all 26 letters. The alphabet is apportioned to the buttons as follows:

No letters are typically mapped to keys 1 and 0, although some corporate voicemail systems use 1 for Q and Z, and some old telephones assigned the Z to the digit 0.

Originally, this scheme was used as a mnemonic device for the exchange prefixes in telephone numbers. When telephone numbers in the United States were standardized in the mid-20th century to seven digits, the first two digits of the exchange prefix were expressed as letters rather than numbers, using the telephone exchange name. Before World War II, the largest cities used three letters and four or five numerals, while in most cities phone numbers had only six digits (2L-4N). The prefix was a name and the first two or three letters, listed as capital letters in directories, were dialed. Later, the third letter, where implemented, was replaced by a digit, or an extra digit was added. This generally happened after World War II, although New York City converted in 1930. The adoption of seven-digit local numbers (2L-5N) was chosen as the requirement for direct distance dialing and progressively deployed starting in the late 1940s.

The famous Glenn Miller tune PEnnsylvania 6-5000 refers to telephone number PE6-5000, a number in service at the Hotel Pennsylvania (212 736-5000) in New York up until 2020 when the hotel closed permanently. Similarly, the classic film BUtterfield 8 is set in the East Side of Manhattan between roughly 64th and 86th Streets, where the telephone prefixes include 288.

The letter system was phased out, beginning before 1965, although it persisted ten years later in some places. It was included in Bell of Pennsylvania directories until 1983. Even today, some businesses still display a 2L-5N number in advertisements, e.g., the Belvedere Construction Company in Detroit, Michigan not only still uses the 2L-5N format for its number (TYler 8-7100), it uses the format for the toll-free number (1-800-TY8-7100).

Despite the phasing out of the letter system, alphabetic phonewords remain as a commercial mnemonic gimmick, particularly for toll-free numbers. For example, one can dial 1-800-FLOWERS to order flowers, or 1-800-DENTIST to find a local dentist.

In addition to commercial uses, alphabetic dialing has occasionally influenced the choice of area codes. For example, when area code 423 (East Tennessee) was split in 1999, the region surrounding Knoxville was assigned area code 865, chosen to represent VOL, for The Volunteer State, the nickname of Tennessee, as well as athletic teams at the University of Tennessee. Similarly, several Caribbean area codes were chosen as an alphabetic abbreviation of the country name.

Fictional telephone numbers 
American television programs and films often use the central office code 555, or KLamath 5 and KLondike 5 in older movies and shows, for fictitious telephone numbers, to prevent disturbing actual telephone subscribers if anyone is tempted to dial a telephone number seen or referred to on screen. Not all numbers beginning with 555 are fictional. For example, 555-1212 is the standard number for directory assistance. Only 555-0100 through 555-0199 are reserved for fictional use. Where used, these are often routed to information services; Canadian telephone companies briefly promoted 555-1313 as a pay-per-use "name that number" reverse lookup in the mid-1990s.

Occasionally, valid telephone numbers are used as song titles. The 1962 Motown hit "Beechwood 4-5789" was written by Marvin Gaye for the Marvelettes, while Stax/Volt Records' Wilson Pickett scored a soul hit in the 1960s with the similarly named "634-5789". A more recent example is the 1981 song "867-5309/Jenny" by Tommy Tutone, which was the cause of a large number of prank calls.

Telephone number formatting 
NANP telephone numbers are usually written as NPA-NXX-XXXX or (NPA) NXX-XXXX . For example, 250 555 0199, a fictional number, could be written as 250-555-0199, (250) 555-0199, 250-5550199, or 250/555-0199. The Government of Canada's Translation Bureau recommends using hyphens between groups; e.g. 250-555-0199.

Using the global formatting for telephone numbers, per recommendation E.164 by the International Telecommunication Union (ITU), a NANP number is written as +1NPANXXXXXX, without spaces or punctuation, e.g. +12505550199.

See also 
List of area code overlays
List of North American Numbering Plan area codes
Numbering Resource Utilization/Forecast Report

References

External links 
North American Numbering Plan Administrator (NANPA)
Canadian Numbering Administrator
Map of the original 86 area codes from 1947
North American Numbering Council 
NANP Discussion 2003 Document - Understanding the North American Numbering Plan

 
International telecommunications
Telephone numbers
Telecommunications-related introductions in 1947